Hvam may refer to:

People 
Frank Hvam (born 1970), Danish comedian
Hjalmar Hvam (1902–1996), Norwegian-American Nordic skier and inventor of the first safety ski binding

Places 
Hvam, Nes, Akershus, Norway
Hvam, Skedsmo, Akershus, Norway
Hvam, one of the archaic names for the Kingdom of Khotan, an ancient Silk Road civilization